.ws is the Internet country code top-level domain (ccTLD) for Samoa. It is administered by SamoaNIC, for the Ministry of Foreign Affairs of the Government of Samoa.

The .ws domain is an abbreviation for "Western Samoa", which was the nation's official name in the 1970s when two-letter country codes were standardized. Although there are no geographic restrictions on registration of most second-level .ws domains, .org.ws, .gov.ws, and .edu.ws registration is restricted.

Prior to March 14, 2008, .ws domains were not allowed to be transferred from one domain registrar to another.

The .ws country code has been marketed as a domain hack, with the ws purportedly standing for "world site",  website or web service, providing a "global" Internet presence to registrants, as it supports all internationalized domain names. A popular use for the domain is for news organizations for URL shortening purposes, mainly suffixed as "(organization name)ne.ws".

Due to its potential popularity, a sliding scale of prices is operated by the registrar, depending on the brevity of the desired domain. Domains with four characters or more are competitively priced while three-, two-, and single-character domains have their own pricing tiers, quickly scaling into thousands of United States dollars. A company named "Global Domains International" operates a multi-level marketing scheme for .ws domain reselling.

In 2016, .ws gained popularity as one of the first domain name registries to offer emoji domains.

, there are approximately 25,000 emoji domains registered on .ws.

Google treats the .ws ccTLD as a generic top level domain gTLD.

See also
 Internet in Samoa

References

External links

 IANA .ws whois information
 SamoaNIC.ws (for registrants in Samoa and some nearby countries)

Country code top-level domains
Communications in Samoa